Steve Guy and Shuzo Matsuoka were the defending champions but did not compete that year.

Kelly Jones and Robert Van't Hof won in the final 7–6, 6–0 against Gilad Bloom and Paul Haarhuis.

Seeds

  Tim Pawsat /  Laurie Warder (first round)
  Grant Connell /  Scott Davis (first round)
  Glenn Layendecker /  Richey Reneberg (first round)
  Paul Chamberlin /  Tim Wilkison (first round)

Draw

References
 1990 Benson & Hedges Open Doubles Draw

ATP Auckland Open
Benson and Hedges Open